Raw Greatest Hits: The Music is a compilation album released by World Wrestling Entertainment (WWE) on December 18, 2007, to coincide with the 15th anniversary of the TV program, Monday Night RAW.
It features theme-music of Raw roster-members of the time - as well as that of former members.

The album, the first WWE album-release to feature the themes "Turn Up the Trouble" for Mr. Kennedy and "Paparazzi" for Melina/MNM, also marks the first time a bonus track from a previous WWE album, Kane's theme "Slow Chemical" by Finger Eleven (previously a bonus track on Canadian and FYE store releases of 2002's WWF Forceable Entry), appears as one of the main tracks. It also features main tracks from a previous album: Randy Orton's theme "Burn in My Light" by Mercy Drive, and Shane McMahon's WWE-produced theme "Here Comes the Money", as exclusive (in this case, to releases sold at Wal-Mart and the United Kingdom) bonus tracks. It was Re-Released by WWE as WWE: Raw Greatest Hits - The Music exclusively on iTunes with 3 bonus tracks.

Track listing

UK & Wal-Mart Edition Bonus Tracks

Re-Released Edition Bonus Tracks

See also

Music in professional wrestling

References

2007 compilation albums
2007 soundtrack albums
WWE albums